University Medical Center New Orleans (UMCNO), is a 446-bed non-profit, public, research and academic hospital located in the Tulane - Gravier neighborhood of New Orleans, Louisiana, providing tertiary care for the southern Louisiana region and beyond. University Medical Center New Orleans is one of the region's only university-level academic medical centers. The hospital is operated by the LCMC Health System and is the largest hospital in the system. UMCNO is affiliated with the LSU Health Sciences Center New Orleans, Tulane University School of Medicine, University of Louisiana at Monroe, Delgado Community College, Dillard University, Our Lady of Holy Cross College, Southern University at New Orleans, and Xavier University of Louisiana. UMCNO is also an ACS designated level I trauma center and has a rooftop helipad to handle medevac patients.

History
Ground was broken for the hospital on April 18, 2011. The design was a joint venture between NBBJ and Blitch Knevel Architects. The construction was managed by a joint venture between Skanska USA Building and MAPP Construction.

The $1.1 billion hospital opened on August 1, 2015, as a replacement for Charity Hospital and University Hospital. University Medical Center New Orleans is affiliated with the LSU Health Sciences Center New Orleans and Tulane University School of Medicine. The hospital is managed by LCMC Health, a private not-for-profit hospital system.

Facilities
The 213,677 square-meter (2.3 million square-foot) hospital features three patient towers with 446-acute care beds including 60 behavioral health beds, 19 operating rooms, 76 pre-op and post-op bays, 56 emergency department exam rooms, nine acute treatment rooms and five trauma rooms. The facility is completely accredited by the Joint Commission of Health Care Organizations (JCAHO).

The hospital is located on 15 hectares (37 acres), and critical areas are all situated at least 6.4 meters (21 feet) above base flood elevation. The facility also features emergency backup power and storm-resistant technology, which will enable it to withstand the impact of a Category 3 major hurricane.

Gallery

See also
List of hospitals in Louisiana
LSU Health Sciences Center New Orleans
Tulane University School of Medicine
Charity Hospital
University Hospital

References

External links

 

Hospitals in Louisiana
Teaching hospitals in Louisiana
Healthcare in New Orleans
Buildings and structures in New Orleans
Hospital buildings completed in 2015
2015 establishments in Louisiana
Trauma centers